Short Night of Glass Dolls (Italian: La Corta notte delle bambole di vetro) is a 1971 Italian giallo film. It is the directorial debut of Aldo Lado and stars Ingrid Thulin, Jean Sorel and Barbara Bach.

Plot 

The corpse of reporter Gregory Moore (Jean Sorel) is found in a Prague plaza and brought to the local morgue. But Moore is actually alive, trapped inside his dead body and desperately recalling how the mysterious disappearance of his beautiful girlfriend (Barbara Bach) led to a terrifying conspiracy of depravity. He begins to walk in through his mind. How Mira's sudden disappearance made the police to suspect him instead. He delves more & more into the matter & discovers a mysterious Klub99 which exteriorly practices music but interiorly more occultly sinister. He ends up visiting the club discretely & searches or at least tries to search every corner of the club. But Moore ultimately fails to search the very room where his missing girlfriend Mira's dead naked body is lying covered with flowers with her sightless eyes staring at the ceiling. As Moore leaves, the janitor of the club checks on Mira's body & praises how lovely she is even after death. Ultimately, the entire fact bounces right back at Moore which takes him to even a more sinister and shocking end.

Cast
 Ingrid Thulin – Jessica
 Jean Sorel – Gregory Moore
 Mario Adorf – Jacques Versain
 Barbara Bach – Mira Svoboda
 Fabijan Šovagović – Professor Karting
 José Quaglio – Valinski
 Relja Bašić – Ivan
 Piero Vida – Kommissar Kierkoff
 Daniele Dublino – Doctor

Production
The original story for the film took place in Sardinia with a story Aldo Lado described as being a story about Sicily and the mafia.  Following the events of the Prague Spring, Lado was sent to Prague to scout locations for a production which never got made. The film was influenced by Lado's time in Prague, and went through various drafts. one titled Le Notti di Malastrana involved screenwriter Ernesto Gastaldi. Lado maintained that the screenwriter who put the final script into form was Sergio Bazzini, who is not mentioned in the credits. 

The went through several directors initially. First was Maurizio Lucidi, followed by Lado who initially turned down the offer to direct. The script then was given to Antonio Margheriti who tried to produce the film, and have Lado shoot the film in Greece. The film then moved on to producer Enzo Doria who got Lado to direct.  Lado initially wanted to have the film as an Italian and Czech co-production shot in Prague. Lado had to fall back on Yugslavian funding, shooting nearly the entire film in Zagreb, Ljubljana, with indoor scenes shot in Rome.  He did eventually get to have three days of shooting in Prague with Barbara Bach. The film took five weeks to shoot in total.

Release
Short Night of Glass Dolls was released in Italy on October 28, 1971 and in West Germany on May 30, 1972. The film was released on DVD by Blue Underground on February 26, 2008.

Reception 
Alison Nastasi of Shock Till You Drop called it "nail-biting" and wrote, "Lado is at his best when Short Night of Glass Dolls confronts political and social unrest with nuanced symbolism." Noel Murray of The A.V. Club wrote, "Short Night presages Eyes Wide Shut in its account of a man wandering through a shadow city while uncovering layers of sleaze, and the film's simple social metaphor, imaginative setpieces, and unsettling finale make it a prime example of diverting suspense." Maitland McDonagh of TV Guide rated it 3/5 stars and called the ending "a genuine shocker". AllMovie praised the film's use of tension as opposed to the gore and violence common to the subgenre. Mike Long of DVD Talk called it "incredibly boring and poorly paced".

References

Sources

External links
 
 

1971 films
1970s thriller films
Italian thriller films
West German films
1970s Italian-language films
Films directed by Aldo Lado
Films scored by Ennio Morricone
Giallo films
Films set in Prague
1970s Italian films